Kleider machen Leute may refer to:

Kleider machen Leute (novella), a short novel by Gottfried Keller
Kleider machen Leute (film), a 1940 German film by director Helmut Käutner
Kleider machen Leute (opera), an opera by Alexander Zemlinsky
Kleider machen Leute (Suder), an opera by Joseph Suder

See also
Clothes Make the Man (disambiguation) (English for )